Potamonautes gonocristatus is a species of crustacean in the family Potamonautidae. It is endemic to Lake Kivu, on the border between the Democratic Republic of the Congo and Rwanda.

References

Potamoidea
Freshwater crustaceans of Africa
Crustaceans described in 1955
Taxonomy articles created by Polbot